Pisidium conventus, the arctic-alpine pea clam, is a species of freshwater bivalve from the family Sphaeriidae.

Description
The small (2.2–2.8 mm.) shell is oval in shape and thin and fragile. It is broad and flattened (laterally compressed) with flattened umbos near the midpoint. The colour is yellowish-white and the periostracum (surface) is silky with fine, concentric striation.

Ecology
P. conventus is a relict of colder climatic periods found only in deep, cold, upland lakes.

Distribution and conservation status
 Not listed in IUCN red list – not evaluated (NE)
 Germany – endangered (gefährdet)
 Poland – vulnerable (VU)
 Nordic countries: Faroes, Finland, Norway and Sweden (not in Denmark, Iceland)
Great Britain and Ireland

References

External links
Pisidium conventus at Animalbase taxonomy,short description, biology,status (threats)
Polish Red Data Book

conventus
Molluscs described in 1877